Tikar is a village in Halvad taluk of Morbi district in the state of Gujarat, India.

Geography

References

Villages in Surendranagar district